Slađana Perunović-Pejović (born 26 March 1984) is a Montenegrin long-distance runner and holder of several Montenegrin records. She placed 77th out of 118 in the 2012 Olympic marathon. She did not finish her 2016 Olympic marathon.

Running career
The 2009 Summer Universiade was held in Belgrade and she competed in both the women's 800 metres and the women's 1500 metres. At the 2011 Summer Universiade she placed 13th out of 22 runners in the women's half marathon with a time of 1:22:16. Perunović achieved the Olympic "B" standard at the Podgorica Marathon in October 2011, finishing in 2:41:02, therefore gaining a spot on the Montenegro team for the 2012 Summer Olympics. At the 2012 Summer Olympics, she finished the marathon in 2:39:07.

In 2013, Perunović competed in the 2013 Games of the Small States of Europe in Luxembourg, where she competed and won in the 10,000-meter and 5,000 meter races; she ran the 10,000-meter in 35:21.00 and the 5,000 meter in 16:53.20.

References

External links

 Sladana PERUNOVIC at All-Athletics
 Slađana Perunović at AK Nikšić

Living people
1984 births
Sportspeople from Nikšić
Montenegrin female long-distance runners
Montenegrin female marathon runners
Olympic athletes of Montenegro
Athletes (track and field) at the 2012 Summer Olympics
Athletes (track and field) at the 2016 Summer Olympics
World Athletics Championships athletes for Montenegro
European Games competitors for Montenegro
Athletes (track and field) at the 2015 European Games
Athletes (track and field) at the 2018 Mediterranean Games
Competitors at the 2009 Summer Universiade
Competitors at the 2011 Summer Universiade
Mediterranean Games competitors for Montenegro